Kenneth Murphy (born 19 June 1956, in Dundee) is a Scottish former footballer who played international football for Australia.

Career
Murphy signed for Dundee United as a youngster and made one official appearance for the first team. Murphy moved on to Forfar Athletic before transferring to Melbourne CroatiaAustralia. Here, he also played for South Melbourne Hellas and Footscray JUST, also qualifying for the national team. Another Dundonian, Allan Boath, played for New Zealand under similar circumstances

Murphy managed former club National League clubs Melbourne Knights FC from 1991 to 1992, Melbourne Zebras 1994 to 1995 and was assistant coach in 2005 at another former club, South Melbourne. He managed Altona Magic although he left after just over a year. In July 2006, two weeks after leaving Altona, he took over at Kingston City.

References

1956 births
Living people
Footballers from Dundee
Scottish footballers
Australian soccer players
Australia international soccer players
Australian soccer coaches
Dundee United F.C. players
Forfar Athletic F.C. players
Downfield F.C. players
National Soccer League (Australia) players
Melbourne Knights FC players
South Melbourne FC players
Scottish emigrants to Australia
Association football midfielders
Melbourne Knights FC managers